Ramesh Srinivasan (born 1976) is a professor of Information Studies.

Professional life 
Ramesh Srinivasan is an associate professor of Information Studies in the Graduate School of Education & Information Studies Graduate Program at the University of California, Los Angeles. He has a Bachelor's degree in Engineering from Stanford, a Masters degree in Science from the MIT Media Laboratory, and PhD from Harvard. Srinivasan is the founder of the research group Digital Cultures Lab, a UC-wide research group focused on technological advances and their impacts on various sectors. 

He has traveled to 70 countries and worked in 30 studying the relationships between new (Internet, social media, and AI) technologies and political, economic, and social life. Srinivasan has published over 70 academic papers and has received 3 peer-reviewed major grants from the National Science Foundation, among other awards and grants. He has worked with governments, businesses, activists, and civil society organizations to advise on technological futures. He also served as a national surrogate for Senator Bernie Sanders’ 2020 presidential campaign and as an Innovation policy committee member for President Biden.

Publications 
Srinivasan’s most recent book, "Beyond the Valley" (MIT press), illustrates potential for a digital world of the future that supports businesses alongside the interests of workers, citizens, cultural diversity, and social justice. The book was named a top ten book in Tech by Forbes and has been covered by dozens of mainstream and progressive media networks. Other books he has authored include: “Whose Global Village? Rethinking How Technology Impacts Our World” with NYU Press, and “After the Internet” (with Adam Fish) on Polity Press. Srinivasan is a regular speaker for TED Talks, and has made routine media appearances on MSNBC, NPR, The BBC, CNN, Al Jazeera, Democracy Now!, CBS, The Young Turks, AtlanticLive, and the Economist. He has written op-eds or contributed to work featured in dozens of major newspapers and magazines, including the New York Times, the Guardian, Wired,  Al Jazeera English, WNYC, Salon, the Washington Post, Foreign Policy, the LA Times, FAZ (Germany), The Financial Times, the World Economic Forum, CNN, Folda Sao Paolo (Brazil), The Washington Post, BBC News, Forbes, The Huffington Post, Christian Science Monitor, National Geographic,  Quartz, CBC, the Economist, and more.

In February 2021, Ramesh was cited in an opinion piece by Thomas Friedman in the New York Times.  Mr. Friedman reiterated Ramesh’s suggestion that America urgently needs to enact a digital bill of rights that “sets the right balance between free speech and algorithms that make hate speech and blatantly false information from unreputable sources go viral.”

Academic background 
Srinivasan earned his Ph.D. in design studies at Harvard; his master's degree in media arts and science at the Massachusetts Institute of Technology; and his bachelor's degree in industrial engineering at Stanford. He has served fellowships in MIT's Media Laboratory in Cambridge and the MIT Media Lab Asia. He has also been a teaching fellow at the Graduate School of Design and Department of Visual and Environmental Design at Harvard. Srinivasan is a regular speaker for TEDx Talks, and makes routine media appearances on NPR, Al Jazeera, The Young Turks, MSNBC, and Public Radio International.

Other projects that Srinivasan has worked on look at how new media technologies impact political revolutions, economic development and poverty reduction, and the future of cultural heritage.  He has worked with bloggers who overthrew the recent authoritarian Kyrgyz regime,  non-literate tribal populations in India to study how literacy emerges through uses of technology, and traditional Native American communities to study how non-Western understandings of the world can introduce new ways of looking at cultural heritage and the future of the internet and networked technologies.  His work has impacted contemporary understandings of media studies, anthropology and sociology, design, and economic and political development studies.

Professional affiliations 
He is a member of the Institute of Electrical and Electronics Engineers (IEEE), the American Anthropological Association, and a member of the editorial boards of several academic journals, including Science, Technology, & Human Values, International Journal of E-Politics, and Information Technologies and International Development. He has worked with governments, businesses, activists, and civil society organizations to advise on technological futures.

Notes

External links
 
 Srinivasan's discussion of his research at LIFT 2009
 UCLA Department of Information Studies

1976 births
Living people
UCLA School of the Arts and Architecture faculty
Stanford University alumni
Harvard Graduate School of Design alumni
Massachusetts Institute of Technology alumni